The 1971 Central American and Caribbean Championships in Athletics were held at the National Stadium in Kingston, Jamaica between 14–17 July.

Medal summary

Men's events

Women's events

Medal table

External links
Men Results – GBR Athletics
Women Results – GBR Athletics
Finals results

Central American and Caribbean Championships in Athletics
Central American and Caribbean Championships
International athletics competitions hosted by Jamaica
Sport in Kingston, Jamaica
1971 in Jamaican sport